KWrite is a lightweight text editor developed by the KDE free software community. Since K Desktop Environment 3, Kwrite has been based on the Kate text editor and the KParts framework, allowing it to use many of Kate's features.

Features 
 Export to HTML, PDF, or PostScript formats
 Block selection mode (see screenshot)
 Code folding
 Bookmarks
 Syntax highlighting
 Encoding selection
 End-of-line mode selection (Unix, Windows, classic Mac OS)
 Word completion
 Supports Plugins
 Supports Vi input mode

See also 

Comparison of text editors
Kate

References

External links
Homepage of KWrite
KWrite user wiki
Handbook
 Repositories:
 Kate/KWrite: Phabricator, cgit and  GitHub (mirror)
 KTextEditor framework: Phabricator, cgit and  GitHub (mirror)
 KSyntaxHighlighting framework: Phabricator, cgit and  GitHub (mirror)
 Bug tracking: in Kate/KWrite, in KTextEditor framework and in KSyntaxHighlighting framework

Free text editors
KDE Applications
MacOS text-related software
Software using the LGPL license
Unix text editors
Windows text-related software